Neoclides is an Asian genus of stick insects in the subfamily Necrosciinae (and as with all mainland Asian genera, in the tribe Necrosciini).  Species have a known distribution from: Indo-China, Borneo, Sumatra, Philippines and New Guinea.

Species 
Neoclides includes the following species:
 Neoclides aesalus (Westwood, 1859)
 Neoclides buescheri Seow-Choen, 2016
 Neoclides cordifer (Redtenbacher, 1908)
 Neoclides diacis (Haan, 1842)
 Neoclides echinatus (Redtenbacher, 1908)
 Neoclides epombrus (Günther, 1929)
 Neoclides heitzmanni Bresseel, 2013
 Neoclides jimi Seow-Choen, 2018
 Neoclides laceratus (Haan, 1842)
 Neoclides magistralis (Redtenbacher, 1908)
 Neoclides marshallae Seow-Choen, 2016
 Neoclides mohamedsaidi (Seow-Choen, 2004)
 Neoclides rivalis (Redtenbacher, 1908)
 Neoclides simyra (Westwood, 1859) - type species (as Creoxylus simyra Westwood)
 Neoclides spiniger (Günther, 1943)
 Neoclides spinofoliatus Seow-Choen, 2017

References

External links

Phasmatodea genera
Phasmatodea of Indo-China
Phasmatodea of Asia
Lonchodidae